The Sound Inside is the second album of New Zealand band Breaks Co-op, first released in 2005 under EMI New Zealand.

Track listing
The Sound Inside
Wonder
The Otherside
Settle Down
Last Night
A Place For You
Duet
Question Of Freedom
LMA
Beats Interlude
Too Easily
Lay Me Down
Twilight

References

2005 albums
Breaks Co-Op albums